Culianu is a Romanian surname. Notable people with the surname include:

Ioan P. Culianu (1950–1991), Romanian historian, philosopher, and essayist
Nicolae Culianu (1832–1915), Romanian mathematician and astronomer, great-grandfather of Ioan

Romanian-language surnames